Lubrza  is a village in Świebodzin County, Lubusz Voivodeship, in western Poland. It is the seat of the gmina (administrative district) called Gmina Lubrza.

, the village has a population of 1078.

Notable residents
 Alexander Tietze (1864–1927), German surgeon

References

Lubrza